Azzedine Ounahi (born 19 April 2000) is a Moroccan professional footballer who plays as a midfielder for club Marseille and the Morocco national team.

Club career

Early career 
A former player of Raja CA and Mohammed VI Academy, Ounahi joined Strasbourg in 2018. In August 2020, he moved to Championnat National club Avranches.

Angers 
On 14 July 2021, Ligue 1 club Angers announced the signing of Ounahi on a four-year deal. He made his professional debut on 15 August 2021 by scoring a goal in club's 3–0 league win against Lyon.

Marseille 
After attracting the interest of several top-tier clubs across Europe, thanks to his breakthrough performances for Morocco at the 2022 FIFA World Cup, on 29 January 2023 Ounahi officially joined fellow Ligue 1 side Marseille for an estimated fee of 8 million euros plus add-ons, signing a contract until June 2027. On 1 February 2023, he scored his first goal for Marseille on his debut against Nantes.

International career

Youth
Ounahi was called up for Morocco U20 to participate in the 2018 Mediterranean Games. On 22 June 2018, he scored a goal at the 68th minute in a tie against Italy. He later went on to win the bronze medal with the team after a victory in the penalty shoot-out against Greece.

Senior
On 23 December 2021, Vahid Halilhodžić gave Ounahi his first call-up to the Moroccan senior national team for the 2021 Africa Cup of Nations. Ounahi made his professional debut for Morocco in the 2021 African Cup of Nations in a 1–0 victory against Ghana on 10 January 2022. In his fourth match with Morocco, he managed to score a double in a 4–1 victory against DR Congo in the 2022 FIFA World Cup qualification – CAF Third Round, which marked his first goal with the national team.

On 10 November 2022, he was named in Morocco's 26-man squad for the 2022 FIFA World Cup in Qatar. After an impressive performance in the round of 16 game against Spain, which Morocco won on penalties, Spanish manager Luis Enrique commented on Ounahi's performance: "My God, where does this guy come from? I was pleasantly surprised by their number eight. I don't remember his name, I'm sorry…". In the quarter-final match against Portugal, which Morocco won 1–0, no Moroccan player had more dribbles (three) or won more duels (seven) than Ounahi. Morocco went on to finish fourth in the tournament.

Career statistics

Club

International

Scores and results list Morocco's goal tally first, score column indicates score after each Ounahi goal.

Honours
Morocco U20
Mediterranean Games third place: 2018

Individual
IFFHS Africa Team of The Year: 2022

Orders
Order of the Throne: 2022

References

External links
 
 

2000 births
Living people
Footballers from Casablanca
Association football midfielders
Moroccan footballers
Morocco under-20 international footballers
Ligue 1 players
Championnat National players
Championnat National 3 players
Raja CA players
Mohammed VI Football Academy players
US Avranches players
Angers SCO players
Olympique de Marseille players
2021 Africa Cup of Nations players
2022 FIFA World Cup players
Moroccan expatriate footballers
Expatriate footballers in France
Moroccan expatriate sportspeople in France
Mediterranean Games bronze medalists for Morocco
Mediterranean Games medalists in football
Competitors at the 2018 Mediterranean Games